Peter Bryce (December 31, 1878 - November 30, 1950) was a Canadian Methodist and United Church of Canada minister. He was elected as Moderator of the United Church of Canada at their 7th General Council in Ottawa, Ontario in 1936.

Early life
Born in Blantyre, Scotland on December 31, 1878, Bryce was raised within a strict conservative Presbyterian household. Inspired by the writings and ministry of John Wesley, however, Bryce eventually joined the Methodist church where he became ordained in 1908.

Speaking about the influence Wesley had on his early faith formation, Bryce noted, "What impressed me about John Wesley, though, was the power with which he preached the gospel. This great evangelist preached day and night, even on street corners, established orphanages where there were none, opened dispensaries for the poor, urged that the luxuries of the rich be taxed instead of the poor, gave money to the poor 20 shillings at a time, and made, in his will, provisions that his pallbearers be six unemployed men to be paid one pound."

After becoming a candidate for ministry in the Methodist Church, Bryce became an evangelist and circuit rider, travelling throughout England and Scotland, before being sent to Canada in 1903 to serve as a missionary on the coast of Newfoundland. Bryce began his theological education at Victoria College in 1906 and was ordained two years later. It was as a student minister in the Earlscourt neighbourhood of Toronto that he began his ministry with the disadvantaged and poor, many of whom were British and Scottish immigrants. This work became a foundation of Bryce's ministry and over the next fifteen years, he advocated for numerous marginalized groups within Toronto, Ontario and nationwide. He had a part in the establishment of workers' compensation, Mothers Allowances, old age pensions, family allowances, Employment Insurance, juvenile and family courts, the legal adoption of orphans, and the Ontario Community Welfare Association. He chaired the Mothers' Allowance Board until 1927 and was president of the Child Welfare Council. He left to become full-time General Secretary of the Federation of Community Service (now the United Way of Canada).

Church involvement
In 1920, Bryce had chaired the National Campaign of the Methodist Church, Canada and by the time of church union, he was appointed secretary of the Mission and Maintenance Fund (now the United Church of Canada Mission and Service Fund).

Bryce was elected Moderator of the United Church of Canada in 1936 and became one of the most travelled and outspoken spiritual leaders in the denomination's history. Just as in his earlier ministry, he remained an advocate for the marginalized, oppressed and voiceless in Canada and beyond. During his term as Moderator, Bryce spoke out against the "vitrolic campaign [of] carefully crafted hatred of the Jew" in Europe and spoke on the issue at a rally in Toronto in 1938.

In his closing address as moderator to the 8th General Council, Bryce remarked, "Whatever the future may bring, the United Church of Canada will carry on with courage, faith and hope. The prayer constantly upon my lips during the past two years has been the prayer that the United Church may be found always true to the cross of Christ."

After completing his Moderatorship, Bryce was called to be the minister of Metropolitan United Church in Toronto, where he served until falling ill in 1948. He died on November 30, 1950, having never fully recovered from his illness.

References

1878 births
1950 deaths
Moderators of the United Church of Canada
Ministers of the United Church of Canada
Members of the United Church of Canada
People from Blantyre, South Lanarkshire
People from Old Toronto